Giovanni Zanni (19 February 1904 – 9 February 1974) was an Italian professional football player.

References 

1904 births
1974 deaths
Association football forwards
Italian footballers
People from Casale Monferrato
People from Omegna
Serie A players
Casale F.B.C. players
Juventus F.C. players
S.S. Lazio players
Atalanta B.C. players
U.S. Catanzaro 1929 players
Footballers from Piedmont
Sportspeople from the Province of Verbano-Cusio-Ossola